This list shows the IUCN Red List status of mammal species occurring in Azerbaijan. One species is endangered, five are vulnerable, and 11 are near threatened.
The following tags are used to highlight each species' global conservation status as assessed on the respective IUCN Red List published by the International Union for Conservation of Nature:

Order: Artiodactyla

 Family: Bovidae
 Genus: Bison
European bison, B. bonasus  reintroduced
Caucasian wisent, B. b. caucasicus 
 Genus: Capra
Wild goat, C. aegagrus 
East Caucasian tur, C. cylindricornis 
 Genus: Gazella
Goitered gazelle, G. subgutturosa 
 Genus: Ovis
Mouflon, O. gmelini 
 Armenian mouflon, O. g. gmelini
 Genus: Rupicapra
Chamois, R. rupicapra 
 Family: Cervidae
 Genus: Capreolus
Roe deer, C. capreolus 
 Genus: Cervus
Red deer, C. elaphus 
Sika deer, C. nippon  introduced
 Family: Cervidae
 Genus: Capreolus
Roe deer, C. capreolus 
 Family: Suidae
 Genus: Sus
Wild boar, S. scrofa

Order: Carnivora

 Family: Canidae
 Genus: Canis
 Golden jackal, C. aureus 
European jackal, C. a. moreoticus 
 Gray wolf, C. lupus 
 Steppe wolf, C. l. campestris
 Genus: Vulpes
 Red fox, V. vulpes 
 Family: Felidae
 Genus: Felis
 Jungle cat, F. chaus 
 European wildcat, F. silvestris 
African wildcat, F. lybica 
 Genus: Lynx
 Eurasian lynx, L. lynx 
 Caucasian lynx, L. l. dinniki
Genus: Panthera
Leopard, P. pardus 
Persian leopard, P. p. tulliana 
 Family: Ursidae
 Genus: Ursus
 Brown bear, U. arctos 
 Family: Procyonidae
 Genus: Procyon
 Common raccoon, P. lotor  introduced
 Family: Hyaenidae
 Genus: Hyaena
 Striped hyena, H. hyaena 
 Family: Mustelidae
 Genus: Lutra
 European otter, L. lutra 
 Genus: Martes
 Beech marten, M. foina 
 European pine marten, M. martes 
 Genus: Meles
 Caucasian badger, M. canescens 
 Genus: Mustela
Stoat, M. erminea 
 Least weasel, M. nivalis 
 Genus: Vormela
 Marbled polecat, V. peregusna 
 Family: Phocidae
 Genus: Pusa
 Caspian seal, P. caspica

Order: Chiroptera

 Family: Vespertilionidae
 Genus: Barbastella
Western barbastelle, B. barbastellus 
 Asian barbastelle, B. leucomelas 
 Genus: Eptesicus
 Botta's serotine, E. bottae 
 Northern bat, E. nilssonii 
 Serotine bat, E. serotinus 
 Genus: Hypsugo
Savi's pipistrelle, H. savii 
 Genus: Miniopterus
Common bent-wing bat, M. schreibersii 
 Genus: Myotis
Bechstein's bat, M. bechsteini 
Lesser mouse-eared bat, M. blythii 
Geoffroy's bat, M. emarginatus 
Whiskered bat, M. mystacinus 
Natterer's bat, M. nattereri 
 Genus: Nyctalus
Lesser noctule, N. leisleri 
Common noctule, N. noctula 
 Genus: Plecotus
Brown long-eared bat, P. auritus 
 Grey long-eared bat, P. austriacus 
 Genus: Pipistrellus
 Kuhl's pipistrelle, P. kuhlii 
Nathusius' pipistrelle, P. nathusii 
 Common pipistrelle, P. pipistrellus 
 Soprano pipistrelle, P. pygmaeus 
 Genus: Vespertilio
Parti-coloured bat, V. murinus 
 Family: Molossidae
 Genus: Tadarida
European free-tailed bat, T. teniotis 
 Family: Rhinolophidae
 Genus: Rhinolophus
Blasius's horseshoe bat, R. blasii 
Mediterranean horseshoe bat, R. euryale 
Greater horseshoe bat, R. ferrumequinum 
Lesser horseshoe bat, R. hipposideros 
Mehely's horseshoe bat, R. mehelyi

Order: Eulipotyphla

 Family: Erinaceidae
 Genus: Erinaceus
 Southern white-breasted hedgehog, E. concolor 
 Genus: Hemiechinus
 Long-eared hedgehog, H. auritus 

 Family: Soricidae
 Genus: Crocidura
 Caspian shrew, C. caspica 
 Gueldenstaedt's shrew, C. gueldenstaedti 
 Bicolored shrew, C. leucodon 
 Genus: Neomys
 Transcaucasian water shrew, N. teres 
 Genus: Suncus
 Etruscan shrew, S. etruscus 
 Family: Talpidae
 Genus: Talpa
 Levant mole, T. levantis

Order: Lagomorpha
 Family: Leporidae
 Genus: Lepus
 European hare, L. europaeus

Order: Rodentia

 Family: Calomyscidae
 Genus: Calomyscus
 Urar mouse-like hamster, C. urartensis 
 Family: Cricetidae
 Genus: Arvicolinae
 European water vole, A. amphibius 
 Genus: Chionomys
 Caucasian snow vole, C. gud 
 European snow vole, C. nivalis 
 Robert's snow vole, C. roberti 
 Genus: Cricetulus
 Grey hamster, C. migratorius 
 Genus: Ellobius
 Transcaucasian mole vole, E. lutescens 
 Genus: Mesocricetus
 Turkish hamster, M. brandti 
 Genus: Microtus
 Common vole, M. arvalis 
 Daghestan pine vole, M. daghestanicus 
 Major's pine vole, M. majori 
 Schelkovnikov's pine vole, M. schelkovnikovi 
 Social vole, M. socialis 
 Family: Dipodidae
 Genus: Allactaga
 Small five-toed jerboa, A. elater 
 Williams' jerboa, A. williamsi 
 Family: Gliridae
 Genus: Dryomys
 Forest dormouse, D. nitedula 
 Genus: Glis
 European edible dormouse, G. glis 
Iranian edible dormouse, G. persicus 
 Family: Hystricidae
 Genus: Hystrix
Indian crested porcupine, H. indica 
 Family: Muridae
 Genus: Apodemus
 Striped field mouse, A. agrarius 
 Caucasus field mouse, A. hyrcanicus 
 Black Sea field mouse, A. ponticus 
 Ural field mouse, A. uralensis 
 Steppe field mouse, A. witherbyi 
 Genus: Meriones
 Libyan jird, M. libycus 
 Midday jird, M. meridianus 
 Persian jird, M. persicus 
 Tristram's jird, M. tristami 
 Vinogradov's jird, M. vinogradovi 
 Genus: Micromys
 Eurasian harvest mouse, M. minutus 
 Genus: Mus
House mouse, M. musculus 
 Genus: Rattus
Brown rat, R. norvegicus  introduced
 Family: Myocastoridae
 Genus: Myocastor
 Coypu, M. coypus  introduced
 Family: Sciuridae
 Genus: Sciurus
 Caucasian squirrel, S. anomalus 
 Red squirrel, S. vulgaris

Locally extinct 
The following species are locally extinct in the country:
 Cheetah, Acinonyx jubatus
 Moose, Alces alces
 Wild horse, Equus ferus
 Onager, Equus hemionus
 Pallas's cat, Otocolobus manul possibly extirpated
 Lion, Panthera leo
 Tiger, Panthera tigris

See also
List of chordate orders
Lists of mammals by region
Mammal classification

References

Azerbaijan
Mammals

Azerbaijan
Azerbaijan